Manolis Andronikos (October 23, 1919 – March 30, 1992) was a Greek archaeologist and a professor at the Aristotle University of Thessaloniki.

Biography
Andronikos was born on October 23, 1919 at Bursa. Later, his family moved to Thessaloniki.

He studied philosophy at the Aristotle University of Thessaloniki and in 1952 became a professor of Classical Archeology at the Aristotle University of Thessaloniki. Later he continued his studies at Oxford University with professor Sir John D. Beazley (1954–1955). He came back to the Aristotle University of Thessaloniki in 1957 where he taught Archeology first as instructor and later (1964) as professor.

He was married to the school teacher Olympia Kakoulidou and loved reading poetry, especially Kostis Palamas, Giorgos Seferis and Odysseas Elitis. He was the founder of a local cultural group named Art.

Manolis Andronikos conducted archaeological research in Veroia, Naousa, Kilkis, Chalkidiki and Thessaloniki, but his main research was done in Vergina, where his teacher, professor K. Rhomaios had founded in 1937 the Aristotle University Excavation at Vergina. His greatest discovery occurred on November 8, 1977, when he found a tomb at Vergina which he identified as that of Philip II of Macedon. It was unplundered and contained many valuable items, such as a golden larnax.  The finds from this tomb were later included in the travelling exhibit "The Search for Alexander" displayed at four cities in the United States from 1980 to 1982. While the discovery is of great archaeological importance, the identification of the tomb with Philip has been disputed by some archaeologists; that said, if the tomb is not Philip's, one of the others in the same complex probably is.

Andronikos was a member of the Archaeological Council (1964–1965), the Athens Archaeological Association, the Macedonian Studies Association, the Association Internationale des Critiques d' Art and the German Archaeological Institute at Berlin. He lived permanently in Thessaloniki on Papafi Street and died on March 30, 1992, having suffered a stroke and been diagnosed with liver cancer.

See also
Ancient Macedonians
Macedon
Vergina Sun

Necrology
 Eugene N. Borza. "Manolis Andronikos, 1919–1992." American Journal of Archaeology 96.4 (Oct., 1992) 757–758.

References

External links

1919 births
1992 deaths
People from Bursa
People from Hüdavendigâr vilayet
Academic staff of the Aristotle University of Thessaloniki
Classical archaeologists
Greek archaeologists
Herder Prize recipients
20th-century archaeologists
Emigrants from the Ottoman Empire to Greece
People from Thessaloniki